Pos Malaysia Berhad is a postal delivery service in Malaysia, with history dating back to early 1800s.

Services
Pos Malaysia provides postal and related services, namely:
 Standard Mail (Flexipack Domestic, Standard Mail, Non-Standard Mail, Postcards, Mel Rakyat, Pos Ekspres, Pos Daftar, Pos Solutions).
 Courier, Express & Parcels CEP (Same Day Delivery, Next Day Delivery, Time Certain Service, Pos Parcel, Pos Ekspres, Pos Laju Prepaid Pack, On-Demand Pick-up, Prepaid Envelopes/Boxes).
 Retail (Bill payments, driving rketplace).

The company holds an exclusive concession to provide mail services through its network of over 926 branches and mini post offices across Malaysia.

About

History
The history of Pos Malaysia Berhad can be traced back to the early 1800s with the establishment of postal services first in the Straits Settlements in Penang, Malacca and Singapore expanding through the rest of Malaya by the early 20th century. Letters were then conveyed through dispatch riders or special messengers. Instead of postage stamps, fees were collected when letters were handed in at the Post Office. Letters posted were given a receipt.

The system later changed when the Indian stamps overprinted with crown and Straits' stamps overprinted with dollars and cents were introduced in 1867. The first inaugural set of postage stamps was introduced in 1901.

The Federated Malay States Posts and Telegraphs Department was formally created on 1 January 1905 with the merger of the postal and telegraph services of Perak, Selangor, Negri Sembilan, and Pahang.

A Malayan Postage Union was established in 1907 that instituted universal postage rates for the Federated Malay States, the Straits Settlements, and Johor. Kedah, Kelantan, and Trengganu joined in 1909 when they transferred from Thailand to British protection.

It also started as a medium for the transmission of letters, newspapers, and business documents. The postal service soon evolved into a multiple services provider. It began to venture into parcel delivery, registrations, insurance service, transaction of money (postal order & money order), and investment of funds (Post Office Saving Bank).

The postal service, then known as Jabatan Perkhidmatan Pos – Postal Services Department (PSD), also began to take over numerous services on behalf of the Government departments. It started to collect payment of electricity bills, sale of dog licences, payment of pensions, sale of television licence and others.

In 1992, Pos Malaysia Berhad was corporated from the PSD. In September 2001, Pos Malaysia Berhad was listed on the then Kuala Lumpur Stock Exchange (now known as Bursa Malaysia Berhad) through a reverse takeover of a Philio Allied Berhad assuming its listing status. Today, Pos Malaysia has many Strategic Business Units - POS Laju, POS, Data Pos, POS ArRahnu, POS Digicert, POS Solutions & POS Online.

Subsidiaries

Associates

See also
 Postage stamps and postal history of Malaysia
 Singapore Philatelic Museum
 List of Malaysian stamps
 Revenue stamps of Malaysia

References

Government-owned companies of Malaysia
Malaysia
Malaysia
Malaysian brands
DRB-HICOM
1992 establishments in Malaysia
Transport companies established in 1992
Companies listed on Bursa Malaysia
Ministry of Communications and Multimedia (Malaysia)